The 1806 Connecticut gubernatorial election took place on April 10, 1806. Incumbent Federalist Governor Jonathan Trumbull Jr. won re-election to a ninth full term, defeating Democratic-Republican candidate William Hart in a re-match of the previous year's election.

Results

References

Notes 

Gubernatorial
Connecticut
1806